Candy is a 1968 sex farce film directed by Christian Marquand from a screenplay by Buck Henry, based on the 1958 novel of the same name by Terry Southern and Mason Hoffenberg, itself based on Voltaire's 1759 novel Candide. The film satirizes pornographic stories through the adventures of its naive heroine, Candy, played by Ewa Aulin. It stars Charles Aznavour, Marlon Brando, Richard Burton, James Coburn, John Huston, Walter Matthau, and Ringo Starr. Popular figures such as Sugar Ray Robinson, Anita Pallenberg, Florinda Bolkan, Marilù Tolo, Nicoletta Machiavelli, Umberto Orsini, and Enrico Maria Salerno also appear in cameo roles.

Plot
High school student Candy Christian wakes up from a daydream where she seemingly descends to Earth from space, in her father's social sciences class, causing much embarrassment. Following a poetry recital at Candy's school, eccentric Welsh poet MacPhisto offers her a ride home in his limousine. En route, MacPhisto forces himself on her but is unable to proceed after becoming too inebriated. With the help of her Mexican gardener, Emmanuel, Candy takes MacPhisto inside in order to help him out of his liquor-soaked clothes. In the basement, MacPhisto drunkenly recites poetry while humping a mannequin, inciting Emmanuel to sexually assault Candy. Scandalized upon walking in on the scene, Candy's uptight father decides to send her away to live with his twin brother Jack and his wife Livia in New York City.

At the airport, the family is accosted by Emmanuel's three vengeful sisters, who accuse Candy of corrupting their brother. During the scuffle, Candy's father is rendered unconscious due to a head injury. The Christians escape by boarding a military plane commanded by General Smight. In exchange for a blood transfusion for her father, General Smight orders Candy to undress, intending to impregnate her. Meanwhile, he accidentally pushes the button that signals his paratroopers to leap from the plane. Realizing this, General Smight jumps as well, only to slip out of his parachute harness.

Upon landing in New York, Dr. Krankheit meticulously performs surgery on Candy's father in front of an audience. When Uncle Jack attempts to seduce Candy during a post-operative cocktail party, the hospital's executive director, Dr. Dunlap, berates her for her perceived lewd behavior, causing her to faint. Dr. Krankheit takes Candy to another room and tricks her into sex by pretending to examine her. While searching for her father, Candy wanders back into the operating room to find that Dr. Krankeit has branded all the nurses with his initials, as he prepares to do so to Livia. When he attempts to have Candy captured so that she is next, she flees the hospital.

Roaming the streets of Manhattan, Candy ends up in a Sicilian bar in Greenwich Village, where she is beset by a group of mobsters. An offbeat underground filmmaker, Jonathan J. John, then takes her into the men's room and shoots her for a film. As the room floods due to broken pipes, two policemen arrive and assault Jonathan, whereupon a drenched Candy escapes. In Central Park, she meets a hunchback who takes her into a deserted mansion later that night. A gang of thieves walk in and proceed to ransack the place, while the hunchback rapes Candy on top of a grand piano. After arresting Candy, the two policemen maliciously plan to frisk her. However, they lose control of their squad car and crash into a club full of drag queens. As mayhem ensues, Candy escapes again.

The next morning, Candy asks for a ride in the back of a semi-trailer truck, which turns out to be the sanctum of Grindl, a sham guru. He teaches her the "seven stages of enlightenment" as a pretext to have sex with her. After several days on the road, Grindl informs Candy that a different guru will guide her through the rest of her journey. Upon arrival in California, Candy is chased through the desert by the New York police officers, but she manages to outwit them. Shortly thereafter, Candy finds her new guru—a robed figure with a toucan on his shoulder, his face covered with white clay. She follows him into an underground Hindu temple, which then partially collapses due to a cataclysm. As the two proceed to have sex, the guru's face is washed clean and Candy is shocked to discover he is actually her brain-damaged father.

As Candy wanders across a field—surrounded by flapping banners and hippies playing music—she revisits many of the characters she met throughout the film, before finally returning to outer space.

Cast

Production
Coburn said, "That film could have been a lot more funny. Unfortunately, the director's timing was of a European nature. The jokes were always a beat behind. They were often a beat off. When you do comedy, you've got to be fast. I think (star) Ewa Aulin only did two films after Candy. Then she married an Italian count or baron. That was also the only film that I made any money on. I had a percentage of the profits. Marlon Brando and Richard Burton had the same deal. It's very unusual for an actor to see anything extra. Of course, that was before the studios set up their Chinese bookkeeping system (laughs)."

Regarding the scene where Grindl attempts to seduce Candy, production manager Gray Frederickson said that Marlon Brando tried to have actual sex with Ewa Aulin on camera.

Reception
Candy was one of many psychedelic films that emerged as the 1960s ended, along with Yellow Submarine, The Trip, Psych-Out, and Head. The film opened to moderate box office, but later became a cult classic from the psychedelic years of film. It was the 18th highest-grossing film of 1968.

According to Variety, the film earned North American rentals of $7.3 million, but because of costs (including over $1 million paid out in participation fees), recorded an overall loss of $25,000. It was the 12th most popular film at the UK box office in 1969.

Reviews were generally positive with a few misgivings. In a review representative of most professional reviewers at the time, Roger Ebert found it "a lot better than you might expect" but missed the "anarchy, the abandon, of Terry Southern's novel". Renata Adler of The New York Times decried "its relentless, crawling, bloody lack of talent".

John Simon wrote, "If you know someone you want to start the new year as nauseated as possible, send him to see Candy."

In 1969, the film earned Aulin a nomination for New Star of the Year – Actress at the 26th Golden Globe Awards.

The film's soundtrack included "Rock Me", an original song from Steppenwolf which became a top-10 success for the band in the spring of 1969.

On the review aggregator website Rotten Tomatoes, the film holds an approval rating of 40% based on 10 reviews, with an average rating of 6.6/10.

Home media
Candy was released on DVD by Anchor Bay on April 10, 2001, as a region 1 widescreen DVD, and was released on Blu-ray by Kino Lorber on May 17, 2016, as a region A widescreen Blu-ray.

See also
 List of American films of 1968
 Candy (Southern and Hoffenberg novel)

References

External links
 
 
 
 

1968 films
1968 comedy films
1960s American films
1960s English-language films
1960s fantasy comedy films
1960s French films
1960s Italian films
1960s satirical films
1960s sex comedy films
ABC Motion Pictures films
American fantasy comedy films
American satirical films
American sex comedy films
Candide
English-language French films
English-language Italian films
Erotic fantasy films
Films based on American novels
Films directed by Christian Marquand
Films scored by Dave Grusin
Films set in California
Films set in New York City
Films shot in New York City
Films shot in Rome
Films with screenplays by Buck Henry
French fantasy comedy films
French sex comedy films
Incest in film
Italian fantasy comedy films
Italian sex comedy films
Teen sex comedy films